Space Invaders is a Japanese shooting video game released in 1978 by Taito. It was developed by Tomohiro Nishikado, who was inspired by other media: Breakout, The War of the Worlds, and Star Wars. It is one of the forerunners of modern video gaming and helped expand the video game industry from a novelty to a global industry. It was first released as an arcade game and later remade on different platforms; re-releases include ported and updated versions. Ported versions generally feature different graphics and additional gameplay options, including  moving defense bunkers, zigzag shots, invisible aliens, and two-player modes. Space Invaders is one of the highest-grossing video game franchises of all time.

Taito released numerous sequels and spin-offs, many of which have also been remade on multiple platforms, including home consoles and handheld devices. Follow up titles are typically released in celebration of the original's anniversary. The first sequels were primarily released in arcades, while later titles were released on portable devices. Sequels often added power-ups and incorporated new gameplay mechanics—like three-dimensional playing fields, bosses, and rhythm-action—to the original's design. Most titles were released internationally, though some are exclusive to select regions. The games have received different receptions: the Atari 2600 port of the original became the video game industry's first "killer app", while some sequels were regarded as insignificant updates. Space Invaders and several of its arcade sequels are often included in video game compilations released by Taito.

It inspired numerous other games. Many companies created clones that copied its gameplay, with more than a hundred Space Invaders clones released for various platforms (such as Super Invader and TI Invaders). Others built upon the original's gameplay (such as Galaxian and Galaga).

Arcade games

Home console games

Portable and handheld games

Compilations

Other titles

See also

Galaxian, a successful shooting game based on Space Invaders, and released by Namco in 1979.
Galaga, a sequel of Galaxian.
Defender, a successful shooting game partially based on Space Invaders, and released by Williams Electronics in 1980.

References

External links

 Official Taito site 
List of Space Invader games by Taito  via archive.org

Video games
Square Enix franchises
Lists of video games by franchise
Video games developed in Japan

ja:スペースインベーダー